The Kushum or Koshim is a river in the West Kazakhstan Region, Kazakhstan.

The Kushum is a distributary of the Ural river. It flows across the Bayterek, Akzhaik and Zhanakala districts. Its water is used for agricultural irrigation and the riverbanks as grazing ground for local cattle. The last stretch of the river, including the lakes adjoining it, is a  Important Bird Area.

Course 
The Kushum begins branching off the right side of the Ural river northeast of the village of Krugloozyornoye. It heads roughly southwards forming meanders and oxbow lakes.

The right bank of the Kushum is bound by steep cliffs, while the left bank is mostly flat. The river is fed by snow, rain and groundwater. The Dongulyuk, Kirov, Pyatimar and Bitik reservoirs, as well as a network of irrigation canals were built along the Kushum river in the last half of the 20th century. Since the dams and canals were built the natural flow was disturbed and the water of the river does not reach lake Zhaltyrkol anymore.

Fauna 
The main fish species in the Kushum include zander, common bream, white-eye bream, chub, perch, silver bream, ruffe, common rudd, blue bream and sabrefish.

See also
List of rivers of Kazakhstan

References

External links

The current state of cross-border rivers of Kazakhstan and problems of their joint using
Restrictions and prohibitions to use wildlife objects and fishery resources at water reservoirs of the Republic of Kazakhstan

Rivers of Kazakhstan
West Kazakhstan Region
Distributaries
Ural basin
Caspian Depression
Important Bird Areas of Kazakhstan